Anolkhi is a Marathi movie released on 17 March 1973. The movie was produced and directed by Kamlakar Torne.

Cast 
Padma Chavan
Shrikant Moghe
Vikram Gokhale
Sharad Talwalkar
Mast. Alankar

Soundtrack
The music has been directed by Sudhir Phadke.
"Dhund Ekant Ha"- Asha Bhosle
"Amachya Raju Ka Rusla"- Asha Bhosle, Sudhir Phadke

References

External links 
  Movie Album - dhingana.com
 Kamlakar Torne Biography - imdb.com
 Sudhi Phadke Discography - in.com

1973 films
1970s Marathi-language films